Todd Jackson (born April 10, 1981) is an American former professional ice hockey player. He was last playing in Pergine in the Italian 2nd Division. Jackson was selected by the Detroit Red Wings in the 8th round (251st overall) of the 2000 NHL Entry Draft.

Prior to turning professional, Jackson attended the University of Maine where he played four seasons with the Maine Black Bears men's ice hockey team, scoring 45 goals and 54 assists in 161 games. Jackson was named the Hockey East Best Defensive Forward for the 2002–03 season.

On June 2, 2004, the Detroit Red Wings signed Jackson to a two-year, entry level contract. However, he never played for the Red Wings or in the National Hockey League.

Awards and honors

Career statistics

Regular season and playoffs

International

References

External links

1981 births
American men's ice hockey left wingers
Detroit Red Wings draft picks
Grand Rapids Griffins players
Ice hockey players from New York (state)
Living people
Maine Black Bears men's ice hockey players
Newcastle Vipers players
Ontario Reign (ECHL) players
Phoenix RoadRunners players
Toledo Storm players
USA Hockey National Team Development Program players
AHCA Division I men's ice hockey All-Americans